The 2016–17 GET-ligaen was the 78th season of Norway's premier ice hockey league, GET-ligaen.

The regular season began play in September 2016. There were no team changes from the 2015–16 season.

Participating teams

Arenas

Vålerenga Ishockey played their last home game at Jordal Amfi on January 7. A new arena will be constructed at the site, planned for completion in September 2018. Vålerenga will finish the season with Furuset Forum as a temporary arena.

Regular season

Winter Classic
An outdoor match featuring Stjernen and Sparta Warriors was played January 21, 2017. The match was played on Fredrikstad stadion and was the first major outdoor match in Norway in the 21st century. The match ended with a 3-0 victory for Sparta in front of a record audience of 12.500.

Standings
<small>Updated as of February 28, 2017.
x – clinched playoff spot; y – clinched regular season league title; r – play in relegation series

Source: scoreboard.com

Statistics

Scoring leaders

List shows the ten best skaters based on the number of points during the regular season. If two or more skaters are tied (i.e. same number of points, goals and played games), all of the tied skaters are shown. Updated as of February 28, 2017.

GP = Games played; G = Goals; A = Assists; Pts = Points; +/– = Plus/Minus; PIM = Penalty Minutes

Source: hockey.no

Leading goaltenders
The top five goaltenders based on goals against average. Updated as of March 25, 2016.

Source: pointstreak.com

Attendance

Source:pointstreak.com

Coaching changes

Playoffs
After the regular season, the top eight teams qualified for the playoffs. In the first and second rounds, the highest remaining seed chose which of the two lowest remaining seeds to be matched against. In each round the higher-seeded team was awarded home ice advantage. Each best-of-seven series followed a 1–1–1–1–1–1–1 format: the higher-seeded team played at home for games 1 and 3 (plus 5 and 7 if necessary), and the lower-seeded team at home for games 2, 4 and 6 (if necessary).

Bracket
Updated as of April 11, 2017.

Source: hockey.no

Qualification
After the regular season had ended, the two lowest ranked teams in the league and the two highest ranked teams in the 1. divisjon competed for the right to play in the 2017–18 GET-ligaen. The tournament was organized according to a double round robin format, where each club played the others twice, home and away, for a total of six games. The points system and ranking method used, was the same as in the GET-ligaen.

Standings
Updated as of March 23, 2017.

q – qualified for next years GET-league; r – will play in next years 1. division

Source: hockey.no

References

External links
  

2016-17
Nor
GET-ligaen